Sattawat Sethakorn; born 26 April 1982 (age 35), also known by his stage name Tae or his Chinese name Tang Chenyu, is a Thai actor and singer active in the Chinese-language entertainment industry. He began his career in Thailand, moved to Taiwan in the early 2000s, and has since worked on productions in mainland China as well.

Career
At the age of 19, Sethakorn decided to move to Taiwan to develop his career further. He quickly improved his Chinese language abilities, only occasionally needing translation assistance in the course of his work.

Personal life
Sethakorn was born in Kanchanaburi. His maternal grandfather was of Teochew Chinese descent, while his other grandparents were native Thai people. His parents are schoolteachers. He has one sister, younger than him by three years. He attended high school at the Sethaburbampen School, Srinakharinwirot in Bachelor of Arts where he graduated after completing all the required coursework in just two years. He got married in a ceremony held in Japan in June 2013. and got divorced in 2016.

Filmography

TV dramas in Thailand

Series

Sitcom

Tv series in china

{|class="wikitable" style="font-size: 85%;"
|-
|Year
|Chinese title
|Title
|Role
|Network
|Notes
|With
|-
| rowspan="1" | 2001 || 偷偷愛上你 || Taiji Prodigy ||  | EBC東森綜合, ET Jacky, 中視無線台, TVB Jade ||  ||  || 
|-
| rowspan="2" | 2002 ||绝世双骄|| The Legendary Siblings 2 ||  | CTS || Wuji ||  || 
|-
|偷偷愛上你|| In Love :: แอบ...รักเธอสุดหัวใจ ||  | CTS || Zhang Cuishan ||  || 
|-
| rowspan="3" | 2004 ||绝对计划|| ||  | Ch ||  ||  || 
|-
|新九品芝麻官||Hail the Judge ||  | GRT Pearl River Channel ||  ||  || 
|-
|小謝與秋容|| ||  | Ch ||  ||  || 
|-
| rowspan="2" | 2005 ||天外飛仙 (電視劇)||The Little Fairy :: อภินิหารดาบมังกรสะท้านพิภพ||  | CTV, ATV || Fu yuanbao ||  || 
|-
|惡靈05||Evil Spirit 05||  | GTV ||  ||  || 
|-
| rowspan="2" | 2006 ||戀愛女王||Love Queen||  | CTS ||  || || 
|-
|天使情人||Angel Lover||  | SCC || Sunny || || 
|-
| rowspan="1" | 2007 ||聊斋奇女子||The Fairies of Liaozhai||  | AHTV ||  || || 
|-
| rowspan="3" | 2008 ||大唐游俠傳||Datang Youxia Zhuan||  | Ch ||  || || 
|-
|大唐游侠传 (电视剧)||Paladins in Troubled Times||  | CCTV || Kongkong'er || || 
|-
|鹿鼎記 (2008年電視劇)||Royal Tramp||  | Jiangsu TV ||  || || 
|-
| rowspan="1" | 2010 ||女媧傳說之靈珠||The Holy Pearl||  | ZJSTV || Wei Liao || || 
|-
| rowspan="1" | 2011 ||'大唐女將樊梨花'||Legend of Fan Liwa||  | Shenzhen TV/SETV ||  || || 
|-
| rowspan="1" | 2012 ||刁蠻俏御醫||Unruly Qiao||  | JXTV/HNTV,/OpenResty!/SETV ||  || || 
|-
| rowspan="1" | 2013 ||薛丁山 (电视剧)||ซิติงซาน ทายาทขุนศึกสะท้านแผ่นดิน||  | SRT ||  || || 
|-
| rowspan="2" | 2014 ||刘海砍樵 (2014年)||อภินิหารรักจิ้งจอกขาว||  | CCTV-8 ||  || || 
|-
|新济公活佛||New Mad-Monk||  | HTV ||  || || 
|-
| rowspan="1" | 2015 ||反恐特战队||Anti-terrorism Special Forces I ∷ ทีมระห่ำ พิฆาตทรชน 1||  | Dragon TV/Chongqing TV ||  || || 
|-
| rowspan="1" | 2016 ||幸福又見彩虹||幸福又見彩虹||  | SZTV-1 HD/CHOCO TV ||  || || 
|-
| rowspan="1" | 2017 ||反恐特战队之猎影||Anti-terrorism Special Forces II ∷ ทีมระห่ำพิฆาตทรชน 2||  | JSTV ||  || || 
|-
|}

Films
2006: Go! Go! G-Boys2016: The Golden Doll''

Discography

 1998 Teen 8 Grade A 
 1998 T-Speed
 1999.7 守护天使
 2000.7 再见，加州海滩

References

1982 births
Living people
Sattawat Sethakorn
Thai expatriates in Taiwan
Thai expatriates in China
Sattawat Sethakorn
Sattawat Sethakorn
Sattawat Sethakorn
Sattawat Sethakorn
Sattawat Sethakorn